Charles B. Wessler (born May 16, 1955) is an American film producer best known for his collaborations with the Farrelly brothers.

Life and career
Wessler's first job was as a production assistant on the film Can I Do It... 'Til I Need Glasses? (1977). He was also a production assistant for George Lucas on The Empire Strikes Back (1980) and Return of the Jedi (1983).

Wessler spent time working at The Ladd Company for Alan Ladd Jr. and at Zoetrope Studios with Francis Ford Coppola. He soon moved on to produce specials for HBO where he hired Peter Farrelly and Bennett Yellen to write a script for the 1987 special, Paul Reiser Out on a Whim. Wessler, Peter Farrelly and Bobby Farrelly went on to develop several scripts together. Their first feature film was Dumb and Dumber (1994) for New Line Cinema. In 1998, he was nominated for the Golden Globe Award for Best Motion Picture – Musical or Comedy for producing There's Something About Mary.

Wessler's other producing credits include It's Pat, Bushwhacked, Me, Myself & Irene, Shallow Hal and Stuck on You and The Heartbreak Kid (2007). His 2010s films included Hall Pass, The Three Stooges (2012), Movie 43 (2013), Dumb and Dumber To (2014).

In 2018 Wessler produced Green Book, directed by Peter Farrelly. The film won numerous awards, including: the Toronto International Film Festival's People Choice Award, Golden Globe Award for Best Motion Picture - Musical or Comedy, Producers Guild of America Award for Best Theatrical Motion Picture, honoree of American Film Institute Movies Of The Year, and the Academy Award for Best Picture.

Filmography
He was a producer in all films unless otherwise noted.

Film

Miscellaneous crew

Actor 

As writer

Thanks

Television

Miscellaneous crew

As director

References

External links
 

1955 births
Living people
Film producers from California
Businesspeople from Los Angeles
Golden Globe Award-winning producers
Producers who won the Best Picture Academy Award